Andrey Sirotkin (born 6 March 1985) is a Russian professional boxer.

Professional career

Sirotkin vs. Ryder 
 John Ryder (26–4-0) faced undefeated Sirotkin. Sirotkin gave Ryder problems early in the fight with his jab. By the time the fight came to the sixth round, Ryder looked like he was gaining control of the fight, hurting Sirotkin with a body shot. The punishment continued in the seventh round, culminating in a right hook to Sirotkin's body, from which he would not recover. Ryder was awarded the KO win in the seventh round.

Professional boxing record

References

External links
 

1985 births
Living people
Russian male boxers
Super-middleweight boxers
Southpaw boxers